Fedor Vladimirovich Andreev (born March 2, 1982) is a former figure skater with dual Russian and Canadian citizenship. In single skating, he is the 2003 Canadian bronze medalist and the 1999 junior national champion. In 2010, he switched to ice dancing and competed for Russia with partner Jana Khokhlova for one season.

Personal life 
Andreev was born in Moscow, Russian SFSR, Soviet Union. His family emigrated to Canada when he was seven. He is the son of ice dance coach/choreographer Marina Zueva, and was formerly coached by his stepfather, Alexei Tchetverukhin. In addition to skating, Andreev also took part in SCCA autocross and drag races. He enjoys drifting and has worked as a model for Abercrombie & Fitch, runway shows, as well as commercials. As of February 2017, he was working at Boston Consulting Group. He became engaged to American ice dancer Meryl Davis on July 13, 2017, and they married in Provence, France in June 2019.

Single skating 
Early in his career, Andreev skated at the Minto Skating Club in Ottawa, Ontario. He was the 1999 Canadian junior national champion and won several medals on the junior grand prix circuit the following season. In 2000, he moved with his mother to Michigan. He moved up to the senior ranks in 2001-2; his best results were a bronze medal at the Nebelhorn Trophy in 2002 and a 3rd-place finish at the 2003 Canadian nationals. He was coached for a time by Richard Callaghan.

In 2003, Andreev briefly considered switching to pair skating with Jennifer Kirk, but the partnership never fully formed. Recurring injuries kept Andreev from competing for several years. He injured his back while training quads which forced him to leave skating in 2005. He did not compete in the 2005-2006 and 2006-2007 seasons.

Andreev returned to competition in the 2007-2008 season and was coached in Detroit by Callaghan. He placed 8th at the 2008 Canadian Championships.

In the 2008-2009 season, he placed 9th at the 2009 Canadian Championships. Later that season, Andreev changed his country affiliation to Azerbaijan in an attempt to represent that country at the 2009 World Championships. He was prevented from doing so because his paperwork was not completed in time. Andreev hoped to qualify for the 2010 Olympics, but was unable to compete at the qualifying event, again due to problems with his paperwork. His goals for the 2009-10 season were to compete at the European Championships and at Worlds, but he was again unsuccessful.

Ice dancing 
In May 2010, it was reported that Andreev planned to switch disciplines and compete in ice dancing with Jana Khokhlova, representing Russia. Andreev stated about the switch, "Igor had always wanted to get me into ice dancing. In the last two years I coached ice dancing a lot and helped out when Igor and Marina were away at competitions, so I gained a lot of knowledge of the rules. I showed elements and steps for other couples sometimes, so ice dance is no longer new to me." Khokhlova and Andreev began training together in the second week of July, working on the ice 5–6 hours a day. They trained in Canton, Michigan with his mother Marina Zueva and Igor Shpilband.

Khokhlova and Andreev made their debut at the Golden Spin of Zagreb in December 2010 and went on to compete at 2011 Russian Nationals, where they finished fifth in the short dance and third in the free dance for fourth place overall. In June 2011, Andreev injured his knee in a bad fall. On September 27, 2011, it was reported that Andreev had decided to retire because of the injury, and that the Khokhlova-Andreev partnership had therefore ended.

Programs

Ice dancing

Single skating

Competitive highlights 
GP: Grand Prix; JGP: Junior Grand Prix

Ice dancing with Khokhlova for Russia

Singles career for Canada

References

External links 

 
 
 

Canadian male single skaters
Russian male ice dancers
Living people
Russian emigrants to Canada
Figure skaters from Moscow
1982 births
Naturalized citizens of Canada